Daniel Dotzauer (born 23 September 1991 in Chemnitz) is a German figure skater. He is the 2010 senior national bronze medalist and 2006–08 junior national champion. Dotzauer represented Germany at the 2010 World Junior Championships and reached the free skate. He was coached by Anett Pötzsch Rauschenbach.

Programs

Competitive highlights
JGP: Junior Grand Prix

References

External links 

 

German male single skaters
1991 births
Living people
Sportspeople from Chemnitz